The Singapore-Cambridge General Certificate of Education Normal Level (or Singapore-Cambridge GCE N-Level) examination is a national examination held annually in Singapore.  It is taken after four years in the Normal (Academic) or Normal (Technical) stream. For subjects examined in English and foreign languages, the examining authority are the University of Cambridge Local Examinations Syndicate. For localised language subjects, the examining authority is the Ministry of Education (MOE).

The Singapore-Cambridge General Certificate of Education Normal Level examination is sub-categorised into Normal (Academic) Level (N(A) Level) and Normal (Technical) Level (N(T) Level), catering to candidates under the Normal (Academic) (abbreviated as N(A)) and Normal (Technical) (abbreviated as N(T)) streams respectively.

Singapore-Cambridge GCE Normal (Academic) Level
The General Certificate of Education Normal (Academic) Level (or GCE N(A)-Level) examinations are taken by Secondary 4 students in the Normal (Academic) stream normally in September and October of the year. Students would normally receive their results by the mid to end of December in the same year they sat for the examinations and their grades are reflected as per the grading system below. Most Normal (Academic) students are offered at least 5 subjects, but may range to as many as 6 or 7 depending on the electives they take on and the school they are in. Mandatory subjects for Normal (Academic) students include English Language, Mathematics (Syllabus A), Mother Tongue Language, Combined Sciences and Combined Humanities.  Although most students are encouraged to take Mother Tongue as a mandatory subject, some students may still choose to be exempt from Mother Tongue depending on varying circumstances, although the margin of exempted students are relatively minimal.

Subjects offered at the Normal (Academic) Level
Subjects that are highlighted in bold are mandatory subjects for students in the Normal (Academic) stream in most secondary schools.

Grading
A student's total grade for the GCE N(A) Levels examinations are calculated using this equation: EMB3. This equation is short for the combined total grades of the student's English Language, Mathematics and Best 3 subjects grades to form a totality. This total grade of EMB3 can be used to determine which courses in higher education the student may pursue after leaving secondary school, although some may still choose to remain in their secondary schools to continue onto Secondary 5 (Normal) and sit for the GCE Ordinary Levels examinations. 

Normal (Academic) students may be offered GCE O-Level subjects depending on the school they are in. Depending on their academic grades reflected from Secondary 1, a student may be considered eligible for taking on GCE O-Level subjects as long as they meet the Minimum Entry Requirements for the particular subject. Currently, only English Language, Mother Tongue Languages and Mathematics may be taken by Normal (Academic) students at the GCE O-Level standard. Students are normally required to have at least a grade B3 (65 and above) in their Secondary 1 or 2 years to be offered the GCE O-Level subject.

Grade Conversion from the GCE O-Level to N-Level

Courses for N(A) students after N(A)-Level
There are five types of education pathways a Normal (Academic) student may pursue after secondary education. These include the Polytechnic Foundation Programme (PFP), Direct-Entry-Scheme to Polytechnic Programme (DPP), Early Admission Exercise (EAE-ITE), Institute of Technical Education NITEC Course and progression to Secondary 5 Normal.

Polytechnic Foundation Programme (PFP)
Polytechnic Foundation Programme (PFP)is a programme that is for Secondary 4N(A) students. It was implemented in 2012 by the Ministry of Education (MOE). It is to provide more pathways to the tertiary education for the Secondary 4 N(A) students instead of going Secondary 5N to take the O-Level. To be eligible, a student must get at least a Grade 3 for the ELMAB3 subjects, getting no more than 12 points (excluding CCA points) and expected to be the top 10% cohort in the whole cohort of Singapore. This programme will only commence estimated during the month of April. Students are expected to pass all modules to advance to Year-One of Polytechnic to take their diploma.

Singapore-Cambridge GCE Normal (Technical) Level
The Singapore-Cambridge General Certificate of Education Normal Technical Level (or Singapore-Cambridge GCE N(T)-Level) are taken by Normal Technical students after four years of secondary school education. This will eventually lead them to the Institute of Technical Education (ITE). Alternatively, if they performed well enough in Secondary 1, they may be laterally transferred to the Secondary 2 Normal (Academic) stream. However, if they have not been laterally transferred in Secondary 2 N(T), but did exceptionally well when taking Secondary 4 GCE N(T) Level, they can be laterally transferred to Secondary 4 N(A) Level in the event they achieved the criteria of ELMAB1 and later on, they can continue studying in Secondary 4 N(A). Students may also opt to read a maximum of 3 subjects at the N(A) level. The curriculum is geared towards strengthening students’ proficiency in English and Mathematics. Students take English Language, Mathematics, Basic Mother Tongue, and Computer Applications as compulsory subjects. The aggregate used for the GCE N(T) Level is ELMAB1 (English, Math, and 1 best subject). The grades are as following:

Grading
A: 70% and above

B: 65% to 69%

C: 60% to 64%

D: 50% to 59%

U: Below 49% ungraded, or failed <<< Will not be shown on the Certificate of Secondary Education. 

The N(T)-Level can be considered a rough analogue of the Certificate of Secondary Education, examined in the UK in the era of the Tripartite System. Schools are not split into technical, secondary modern, or grammar, as they were in Britain, but rather follow the comprehensive system used in Britain today. However, there exists 1 technical school or specialised N(T) school, Spectra Secondary School.

See also
 Secondary education in Singapore
 Singapore-Cambridge GCE Ordinary Level
 Singapore-Cambridge GCE Advanced Level

References

Education in Singapore